Assebbab is a commune in Guercif Province of the Oriental administrative region of Morocco. At the time of the 2004 census, the commune had a total population of 6721 people living in 948 households. The 2014 census recorded a population of 7069 living in 1083 households.

References

Populated places in Guercif Province
Rural communes of Oriental (Morocco)